An election was held in New York City to election the President of its Council on November 2, 1897. The charter of the new City of Greater New York had created a bicameral Municipal Assembly, comprising an upper Council and a lower Board of Aldermen. The Council president was elected citywide while the Board of Aldermen elected its own president.

Democrat Randolph Guggenheimer defeated Republican candidate Appleton, N. D. and C. U candidate Schmann, and O'Neill, who ran under the label "Democrat of Thomas Jefferson", to win the Council Presidency.

The bicameral Municipal Assembly would prove to be short-lived, and it was replaced with a unicameral Board of Aldermen in 1901, whose President was elected citywide.

References

New York City Council President
New York City Council elections
Council President election
New York City Council President election